Trypanaresta plagiata is a species of tephritid or fruit flies in the genus Trypanaresta of the family Tephritidae.

Distribution
the species is found in Chile.

References

Tephritinae
Insects described in 1854
Diptera of South America
Endemic fauna of Chile